The 2017–18 season was Parma's first season in Serie B since 2009. Parma were promoted by winning the 2016–17 Lega Pro promotion play-offs, which was the second consecutive promotion for Parma since the club's bankruptcy in 2015. 

Parma achieved their third consecutive promotion on 18 May 2018 by finishing second in the 2017–18 Serie B season, making a return to Serie A for the season 2018–19 season. On 23 July 2018, Parma were handed a 5-point deduction for the 2018–19 Serie A season, following text messages from Parma player Emanuele Calaio "eliciting a reduced effort" from two players of Spezia, a match Parma won 2–0 to secure promotion this season.

Squad
As of 28 August 2017

Out on loan

Transfers

Summer

In:

Out:

Winter

Competitions

Serie B

League table

Results summary

Results by matchday

Results

Coppa Italia

Squad Statistics

Appearances and goals

|-
|colspan="14"|Players who left Parma during the season:

|}

Goal scorers

Disciplinary Record

Notes

References

Parma Calcio 1913 seasons
Parma